The Andrew Lang Lecture series is held at the University of St. Andrews. The lectures are named after Andrew Lang, a graduate of the university.

Lectures
 December 1927 – 'Andrew Lang', by George Gordon.
 1928 – 'Andrew Lang's work for Homer', by Alexander Shewan.
 1929 – 'The raw material of religion', by R. R. Marett.
 1930 – 'Andrew Lang as historian', by Robert S. Rait.
 1931 – 'Andrew Lang and the Maid of France', by Louis Cazamian
 1932 – 'Andrew Lang and the Border', by John Buchan (Lord Tweedsmuir).
 6 December 1933 – 'Lang, Lockhart and biography', by H. J. C. Grierson.
 21 November 1934 – 'Andrew Lang and the House of Stuart', by John Duncan.
 1937 – 'Andrew Lang's poetry', by A. Blyth Webster.
 8 March 1939 – 'On Fairy-Stories', by J. R. R. Tolkien
 7 May 1947 – 'Andrew Lang the poet', by Gilbert Murray.
 5 April 1948 – 'Law and custom', by Hugh Pattisan MacMillan, Baron MacMillan.
 11 May 1949 – 'Andrew Lang and the casket letter controversy' by J. B. Black.
 11 May 1950 – 'Andrew Lang and journalism', by J. B. Salmond.
 25 April 1951 – 'Andrew Lang : his place in anthropology', by Herbert J. Rose.
 14 November 1951 – 'Andrew Lang, John Knox and Scottish Presbyterianism', by William Croft Dickinson.
 16 February 1955 – 'Homer and his forerunners', by Maurice Bowra.
 14 November 1956 – 'Shakespeare's Scotland', by James Fergusson.
 8 February 1978 – 'The writing of Scottish history in the time of Andrew Lang', R.G. Cant.
 (not known) 1980 – 'Physiological Symbols', Rodney Needham.
 26 January 1988 – 'The Scottish paradox' by Gordon Wilson
 29 April 2004 – 'Hamlet and the Tables of Memory' by Peter Stallybrass 
 1 November 2012 – 'Folklore versus Fakelore: An Imagined Conversation with Andrew Lang' by Jane Yolen, the first woman to give the Andrew Lang lecture  
 31 October 2017 - " Andrew Lang and the Folkloristic Legacy of 'The Forest'" by Lizanne Henderson, 90th Anniversary Lecture
 16 February 2021 - 'Andrew Lang's Fairy Tales' by Andrew Teverson, the first Andrew Lang lecture to be delivered on-line

References
University of St. Andrews Library catalogue

Lang
University of St Andrews